Acrocercops psaliodes is a moth of the family Gracillariidae. It is known from India (Karnataka and Maharashtra).

The larvae feed on Bridelia species. They mine the leaves of their host plant. The mine has the form of a short broad gallery under the upper cuticle of the leaf. The frass is gathered along both sides of the gallery.

References

psaliodes
Moths described in 1926
Moths of Asia